Marko Topchii (born January 7, 1991) is a classical guitarist from Ukraine. Topchii has won more than 100 awards worldwide in the international classical guitar competitions in the professional category. Among them, 50 first places in the competitions in United States, Mexico, Australia, Japan, China, Taiwan, Singapore, South Korea, Indonesia, Germany, Switzerland, Netherlands, France, Spain, Italy, Portugal, Liechtenstein, Poland, Hungary, Serbia, Croatia, Bulgaria, Montenegro, and Ukraine.

Biography

Birth and education
Marko Topchii was born in 1991 in Kyiv, Ukraine, to a family of musicians.Нe started studying the guitar at the age of four with Volodymyr Homenyuk and later with Borys Belsky.2011 - graduated from the Kharkiv National Kotlyarevsky University of Arts under Prof. Volodymyr Dotsenko, Merited Artist of Ukraine.2016 - completed a three-year postgraduate program at the Petro Tchaikovsky National Music Academy of Ukraine in Kyiv under Prof. Yuri Aleksik, Merited Artist of Ukraine.2019 - completed the professional studies program at the San Francisco Conservatory of Music under Prof. Judicaël Perroy.

Career
Being multi-award-winning classical guitarist, orchestra soloist, concertist, Marko has won more than 100 awards worldwide in the international classical guitar competitions in the professional category. Among them, 46 first places.
In the fall of 2018, he appeared on the cover of the issue No. 391 of the Classical Guitar Magazine: Marko Topchii, Perennial Prize Winner. The issue also included the interview: Marko Topchii, Inside the World of One of the Most Successful and Widely Travelled Competitors.
In 2017, he appeared on the cover of the issue No. 12 of Polish classical guitar magazine Sześć Strun Świata (Six Strings of the World). The issue also included the interview.
Marko often performs with orchestras, having more than ten concertos for guitar and orchestra in the repertoire. He has performed at Carnegie Hall, the Salle Cortot (Paris), Yamaha Ginza Hall (Tokyo), Tchaikovsky Hall (Moscow).
Marko has recorded three solo CD albums: 
2016 Fleur de Son Classics in Buffalo, NY as a winner of JoAnn Falletta International Guitar Concerto Competition,
2016 Contrastes Records in Seville, Spain as a winner of the International Classical Guitar Competition "Gredos San Diego" (Madrid, Spain),2018 Naxos Records as the winner of the Michele Pittaluga International Classical Guitar Competition.

 Topchii is an official D'Addario artist since 2012.

Awards
Topchii has won many awards worldwide in the international classical guitar competitions in the professional category.
To see the actual list please look at the tables below:

First prizes

Second prizes

Third prizes

Special prizes

Recordings
The conventional CD recordings are listed below:

Topchii has many video recordings on his official YouTube channel.

External links

References

Ukrainian classical guitarists
Ukrainian classical musicians
Ukrainian guitarists
Classical guitarists
21st-century guitarists
21st-century classical musicians
San Francisco Conservatory of Music alumni
Kyiv Conservatory alumni
Musicians from Kyiv
1991 births
Living people